The Court Theatre is a professional theatre company based in Christchurch, New Zealand. It was founded in 1971 and located in the Christchurch Arts Centre from 1976 until the February 2011 Christchurch earthquake. It opened new premises in Addington in December 2011.  It is currently New Zealand's largest theatre company, and is led by Chief Executive Barbara George and Artistic Director Daniel Pengelly.

History

Founding and early years

The company was founded by Yvette Bromley  and Mervyn Thompson in 1971 who served as Co-artistic Directors for the first three years of the company. Bromley chose the theatre's name out of affection for the Royal Court Theatre in London, which she knew well from her upbringing and drama education.

During the first eighteen months of its existence, The Court had three venues. The first was the Stone Chamber of the Canterbury Provincial Council Chambers (April – May 1971), where The Court's début production, The Prime of Miss Jean Brodie was staged. Occasionally the Māori Land Court would require the use of the chamber, necessitating the set being struck and taken to the Durham Street Art Gallery; the furniture being moved back into the chamber and the process reversed for the next evening's performance. The Stone Chamber was one of the city's most magnificent structures, but it was impractical for a theatre company, as there was little room for an audience and a lack of toilets.

Next was the Durham Street Art Gallery (June 1971 – May 1972), which was used as an interim venue between the Canterbury Society of Arts vacating the premises and the Law Court expanding into the area. From June to August 1972, The Court was housed in the Beggs Theatrette and staged two productions in the space.

The next four years (September 1972 – February 1976) were a period of relative stability. The Court Theatre was housed at The Orange Hall on Worcester Street. In 1974, Mervyn Thompson stood down leaving Yvette Bromley as sole Artistic Director until 1975 when Randall Wackrow (who had joined the company as Business Manager in 1973) joined her as Co-Director.

The Arts Centre

In 1976, the company moved to the Christchurch Arts Centre complex, in the buildings which were formerly the Engineering School of Canterbury College. The performance space was previously lecture room D.

From 1977 to 1978, Randall Wackrow served as sole Artistic Director, standing down in 1979 with the appointment of Elric Hooper. Hooper served as Artistic Director for more than two decades. Hooper declared his intent to balance the theatre's repertoire with "three main thrusts — the classic, the contemporary and the indigenous". Although economic pressure saw a fledgling second auditorium, Court Two, closed as a regular venue following the economic slump of the mid-eighties (although it was to be later revived as The Forge), overall this philosophy was rewarded.

The Court expanded its company with the introduction of Theatresports to Australasia in the late 1980s and the formation of professional improvisation troupe, The Court Jesters in 1989. 

In 1990, Hooper was awarded an MBE and the 1990 Commemoration medal by the Queen. Hooper retired as Artistic Director in 1999 and Catherine Downes served as Artistic Director of The Court Theatre from 2000 to 2005. Ross Gumbley became The Court's Artistic Director in 2006 and helped The Court find a new home in Addington when the 2011 Christchurch earthquake destroyed The Court's Arts Centre home.

The Shed, Addington

The Court remains in The Shed while planning for a permanent home in the city. In December 2019, Ross Gumbley became The Court's Artistic Adviser/Lead Director, helping to plan for this new future, while Daniel Pengelly took over as Interim Artistic Director. In May 2020, Pengelly was appointed Artistic Director until 31 December 2020.

During the 2020 COVID-19 pandemic, the Court Theatre's shows were postponed or cancelled. The Court began staging productions in The Shed's foyer with safety measures in place in August 2020 and on 21 September 2020 announced that the main auditorium would be reopening.

Current role and activities 
The Court Theatre employs professionals from around the country and internationally. It sustains a full-time professional staff and an ensemble acting company and is administered by The Court Theatre Trust.

In addition to being a full-time professional theatre company, The Court Theatre operates numerous other activities in the community. The company annually tours a show regionally around the South Island. Its education programme provides training for school-age students and adults, regularly liaising with high school and tertiary institutions as well as other community groups. The company also produces school holiday kids' shows and an annual touring primary school show.

Furthermore, the company employs a troupe of professional improvisors and corporate entertainers, The Court Jesters. The most public face of their work is the improv comedy show "Scared Scriptless" which is staged every Friday night at 10:15pm.

References

External links

Official website

Arts organizations established in 1971
Organisations based in Christchurch
Culture in Christchurch
Theatre companies in New Zealand
1971 establishments in New Zealand